

2014–15 Top 3 standings

Standings

References

Nation